In mathematics, specifically in ring theory, a torsion element is an element of a module that yields zero when multiplied by some non-zero-divisor of the ring. The torsion submodule of a module is the submodule formed by the torsion elements. A torsion module is a module that equals its torsion submodule. A module is torsion-free if its torsion submodule comprises only the zero element.

This terminology is more commonly used for modules over a domain, that is, when the regular elements of the ring are all its nonzero elements.

This terminology applies to abelian groups (with "module" and "submodule" replaced by "group" and "subgroup"). This is allowed by the fact that the abelian groups are the modules over the ring of integers (in fact, this is the origin of the terminology, that has been introduced for abelian groups before being generalized to modules).

In the case of groups that are noncommutative, a torsion element is an element of finite order. Contrary to the commutative case, the torsion elements do not form a subgroup, in general.

Definition 
An element m of a module M over a ring R is called a torsion element of the module if there exists a regular element r of the ring (an element that is neither a left nor a right zero divisor) that annihilates m, i.e., 
In an integral domain (a commutative ring without zero divisors), every non-zero element is regular, so a torsion element of a module over an integral domain is one annihilated by a non-zero element of the integral domain. Some authors use this as the definition of a torsion element, but this definition does not work well over more general rings.

A module M over a ring R is called a torsion module if all its elements are torsion elements, and torsion-free if zero is the only torsion element.  If the ring R is an integral domain then the set of all torsion elements forms a submodule of M, called the torsion submodule of M, sometimes denoted T(M). If R is not commutative, T(M) may or may not be a submodule. It is shown in  that R is a right Ore ring if and only if T(M) is a submodule of M for all right R-modules. Since right Noetherian domains are Ore, this covers the case when R is a right Noetherian domain (which might not be commutative).

More generally, let M be a module over a ring R and S be a multiplicatively closed subset of R. An element m of M is called an S-torsion element if there exists an element s in S such that s annihilates m, i.e.,  In particular, one can take for S the set of regular elements of the ring R and recover the definition above.

An element g of a group G is called a torsion element of the group if it has finite order, i.e., if there is a positive integer m such that gm = e, where e denotes the identity element of the group, and gm denotes the product of m copies of g. A group is called a torsion (or periodic) group if all its elements are torsion elements, and a  if its only torsion element is the identity element. Any abelian group may be viewed as a module over the ring Z of integers, and in this case the two notions of torsion coincide.

Examples 

 Let M be a free module over any ring R. Then it follows immediately from the definitions that M is torsion-free (if the ring R is not a domain then torsion is considered with respect to the set S of non-zero-divisors of R). In particular, any free abelian group is torsion-free and any vector space over a field K is torsion-free when viewed as the module over K. 
 By contrast with example 1, any finite group (abelian or not) is periodic and finitely generated. Burnside's problem, conversely, asks whether any finitely generated periodic group must be finite? The answer is "no" in general, even if the period is fixed.
 The torsion elements of the multiplicative group of a field are its roots of unity.
 In the modular group, Γ obtained from the group SL(2, Z) of 2×2 integer matrices with unit determinant by factoring out its center, any nontrivial torsion element either has order two and is conjugate to the element S or has order three and is conjugate to the element ST. In this case, torsion elements do not form a subgroup, for example, S·ST = T, which has infinite order.
 The abelian group Q/Z, consisting of the rational numbers modulo 1, is periodic, i.e. every element has finite order. Analogously, the module K(t)/K[t] over the ring R = K[t] of polynomials in one variable is pure torsion. Both these examples can be generalized as follows: if R is an integral domain and Q is its field of fractions, then Q/R is a torsion R-module.
 The torsion subgroup of (R/Z, +) is (Q/Z, +) while the groups (R, +) and (Z, +) are torsion-free.  The quotient of a torsion-free abelian group by a subgroup is torsion-free exactly when the subgroup is a pure subgroup.
 Consider a linear operator L acting on a finite-dimensional vector space V. If we view V as an F[L]-module in the natural way, then (as a result of many things, either simply by finite-dimensionality or as a consequence of the Cayley–Hamilton theorem), V is a torsion F[L]-module.

Case of a principal ideal domain 

Suppose that R is a (commutative) principal ideal domain and M is a finitely generated R-module. Then the structure theorem for finitely generated modules over a principal ideal domain gives a detailed description of the module M up to isomorphism. In particular, it claims that

 

where F is a free R-module of finite rank (depending only on M) and T(M) is the torsion submodule of M. As a corollary, any finitely generated torsion-free module over R is free. This corollary does not hold for more general commutative domains, even for R = K[x,y], the ring of polynomials in two variables.
For non-finitely generated modules, the above direct decomposition is not true. The torsion subgroup of an abelian group may not be a direct summand of it.

Torsion and localization 

Assume that R is a commutative domain and M is an R-module. Let Q be the quotient field of the ring R. Then one can consider the Q-module

 

obtained from M by extension of scalars. Since Q is a field, a module over Q is a vector space, possibly infinite-dimensional. There is a canonical homomorphism of abelian groups from M to MQ, and the kernel of this homomorphism is precisely the torsion submodule T(M). More generally, if S is a multiplicatively closed subset of the ring R, then we may consider localization of the R-module M,

 

which is a module over the localization RS. There is a canonical map from M to MS, whose kernel is precisely the S-torsion submodule of M.
Thus the torsion submodule of M can be interpreted as the set of the elements that "vanish in the localization". The same interpretation continues to hold in the non-commutative setting for rings satisfying the Ore condition, or more generally for any right denominator set S and right R-module M.

Torsion in homological algebra 

The concept of torsion plays an important role in homological algebra. If M and N are two modules over a commutative domain R (for example, two abelian groups, when R = Z), Tor functors yield a family of R-modules Tori (M,N). The S-torsion of an R-module M is canonically isomorphic to TorR1(M, RS/R) by the exact sequence of TorR*: The short exact sequence  of R-modules yields an exact sequence , hence  is the kernel of the localisation map of M. The symbol  denoting the functors reflects this relation with the algebraic torsion.  This same result holds for non-commutative rings as well as long as the set S is a right denominator set.

Abelian varieties 

The torsion elements of an abelian variety are torsion points or, in an older terminology, division points.  On elliptic curves they may be computed in terms of division polynomials.

See also
 Analytic torsion
 Arithmetic dynamics
 Flat module
 Annihilator (ring theory)
 Localization of a module
 Rank of an abelian group
 Ray–Singer torsion
 Torsion-free abelian group
 Universal coefficient theorem

References

Ernst Kunz, "Introduction to Commutative algebra and algebraic geometry", Birkhauser 1985,  
Irving Kaplansky, "Infinite abelian groups", University of Michigan, 1954.

Abelian group theory
Module theory
Homological algebra